Karavi ("ship"), is an uninhabited Greek islet, in the Aegean Sea, close to the northeastern coast of eastern Crete. The small islet lies close to the island of Kyriamadi. Administratively it lies within the Itanos municipality of Lasithi.

See also
List of islands of Greece

Landforms of Lasithi
Uninhabited islands of Crete
Islands of Greece